Hamza Saghiri (born 18 February 1997) is a German professional footballer who plays as a midfielder for Viktoria Köln.

Career
Saghiri made his professional debut in the 3. Liga for Viktoria Köln on 20 July 2019, starting against Hansa Rostock before being substituted out at half-time for Moritz Fritz, with the match finishing as a 3–3 away draw.

References

External links
 
 

1997 births
Living people
People from Würselen
Sportspeople from Cologne (region)
Footballers from North Rhine-Westphalia
German footballers
Association football midfielders
FC Viktoria Köln players
SV Waldhof Mannheim players
3. Liga players
Regionalliga players